The Banu Israil or Bani israili are a Muslim community found in the state of Uttar Pradesh in India. Their name means "Children of Israel", and the community claims descent from the Jewish community of Madinah. They belong to the Shaikh caste, and typically carry the surname Israily. They should not be confused with the Bene Israel, a Jewish community found in western India.

Origin 

The exact circumstances of their settlement in India is unclear, but their traditions make clear that they were Muslims at the time of their settlement. They are largely an urban community, occupying distinct quarters in a number of towns and cities in western Uttar Pradesh, such as Banu Israilyan in Aligarh. Quite a few of them occupied important administrative positions under both the Sultanate of Delhi and its successor, the Mughal Empire. This was especially true of the Banu Israil of Aligarh, where the community were the heredity kotwals, a post which entailed being both the head of police and garrison commander.

Although largely an urban community, there were several settlements of rural Banu Israil in Etah District. These Banu Israil are unique in that they are largely a community of farmers. In additions, the community were found  in the town of Dhampur in Bijnor District, in Bilari in Moradabad District, in Sahaswan and Badaun in Badaun District, and in the city of Bareilly in Bareilly District.

See also 
 Shaikh of Uttar Pradesh
 Jewish tribes of Arabia

References

External links
 Religion Journal: The Indian Muslims with Ties to Israel – The Wall Street Journal

Shaikh clans
Muslim communities of Uttar Pradesh
Muslim communities of India
Jews and Judaism in India
Jews and Judaism in Pakistan
Groups claiming Israelite descent
Social groups of Uttar Pradesh
Hejazi Jews